Kartar Singh Komal was born in 1913 at Fujipur (Srinagar). He passed his Matric and Gyani examinations and adopted the career of teaching. During his job as teacher in Khalsa School he was closely associated with the Shiromani Khalsa  Darbar and Kashmir Central Sikh League.

He participated in the freedom struggle and was gaoled several times. Before 1947 he had been publishing a fortnightly Urdu paper "Karam Veer". He was editor of "Shamsheer" too. He wrote several books, viz. Dharam Dhwaj (1936), Komal Hularey (1958), Samaj Sudhar Bare Anmol Gurmat Vichar (1982).

Komal was instrumental in the enactment of the Kashmir Gurdwaras Act, for which he, along with other leaders of the Sikhs, struggled very hard. Komal was a dedicated and unassuming social worker. Until the age of 79 years he served the Kashmiri Sikhs. He died in 1992.

1913 births
1992 deaths
Educators from Jammu and Kashmir
Indian newspaper editors